Odense Steel Shipyard was a Danish shipyard company located in Odense.  It was best known for building container ships for its parent group, A.P. Moller – Maersk Group, including the Mærsk E class in 2006 which at the time were the biggest container ships in the world.  The global financial crisis led to Maersk announcing its closure in 2009 and the last new ship was delivered in January 2012.

Company history
The first yard was opened in 1918–1919 by the A.P. Møller company.  A new yard with bigger and better facilities was constructed 1957–1959 on a new site located in Munkebo a few kilometres outside Odense proper. Odense Steel Shipyard was the largest yard within the Odense Steel Shipyard Group, which also consisted of two yards and an engineering company, all situated in the Baltic.  The yard was known for designing and building innovative vessels that applied the newest technology in design and equipment.

Since 1996 the Yard built some of the world's largest container ships; including the Mærsk E-class with a nominal capacity of 15,550 TEU (originally declared as 11,000 TEU), the highest equivalent number of any vessel as of today. However, Maersk chose Daewoo to build its latest and largest design, the Triple E class with a nominal capacity of 18,000 TEU, as the Asian shipyard was more competitive.

The original shipyard remained in operation until 1966, when all operations were transferred to the new site. Unlike the modern shipyard, the old yard produced civilian and merchant vessels only. Its first completed ship was cargo steamship Robert Mærsk, completed in 1920. Its last production was Yard No. 177, the bulk carrier Laura Mærsk.

The new Odense Steel Shipyard (the "Lindø" Yard)
The yard was enlarged in 1967 to include a new very large building dock, No. III (415 × 90 metres), and an 800-ton, 95-metre tall, 148.5-metre span gantry crane, allowing the construction of tankers in the VLCC and ULCC class. The largest construction planned on the yard was two  tankers, but this order was later cancelled. From the 1960s until 1977, the yard only constructed oil tankers (no larger than ) as well as bulk carriers. The first RO-RO ship was built in 1979, and the first container ship in 1980. In December 1992, the yard completed the world's first 300,000 DWT double-hull tanker. In January 1996 they delivered its first Post-Panamax container ship. On 3 December 1999 the gantry crane collapsed after a hurricane in the building dock and damaged the ship No.170 Cornelius Mærsk, which was nonetheless was repaired and delivered two months later. MAN Takraf of Leipzig, Germany, delivered a new 1,000 ton, 110-metre tall gantry crane in April 2001.

The collapse in world shipping as a result of the 2009 Global Recession led Maersk to announce in January 2009 that Odense would concentrate on smaller ships but in May 2009 they announced that they would be closing the yard altogether and putting Baltija Shipyard in Lithuania up for sale. The last newbuild from Lindø was No.714 Niels Juel, a frigate for the Royal Danish Navy, which was delivered in January 2012.

After yard closure
After the closure of the yard in 2012, the site has been transformed to an industrial park housing a large number of companies within the offshore sector; the Lindoe Offshore Renewables Centre. Most companies work with production, storage and discharge of large components for offshore and heavy industries.

In 2016 elements of the yard Odense Maritime Technology (OMT ) were proposing the s for the Procurement programme of the Royal Australian Navy's frigates, but built in Australia.

List of ships built at Lindø

References

Buildings and structures in Odense
Shipbuilding companies of Denmark
Maersk
Container ships
Danish companies established in 1917